Neorhodomela larix, commonly known as black pine, is a species of red algae native to coastal areas of the North Pacific, from Mexico to the Bering Sea to Japan. It forms dense mats on semi-exposed rocks in intertidal areas. The thallus is dark brown to black in color with whorled branches resembling a bottlebrush.

Ecology
The brown alga Soranthera ulvoidea is commonly found as an epiphyte on Neorhodomela species, especially N. larix  Isabella Abbott notes that individuals of Soranthera growing on Neorhodomela species as a host differ from those found on other hosts by tending to be attached more broadly, thick walled, spherical, and occurring primarily in northern or central California.

References

External links
Neorhodomela larix at University of California, Santa Cruz
Neorhodomela larix at AlgaeBase. Includes photo gallery

Rhodomelaceae